The Young Algerians were a political group established in French Algeria in 1907. They were assimilationists, meaning that they wanted Algerian society to integrate with French colonial society. As such, they called for reforms that would give France's Algerian subjects the same rights as French citizens enjoyed.

Influential figures in the group included Khalid ibn Hashim and Ferhat Abbas.

History
The Young Algerians emerged from a new group of middle class Algerians who were integrated into the French economic system and had gone through the French education system. They were influenced by the Young Tunisians movement, and established a number of study circles. In 1908 they went to France to meet Prime Minister Georges Clemenceau and expressed their opposition to Algerian conscription unless they were extended full civil rights. Clemenceau subsequently gave Muslims the right to elect Algerian members of the general councils, rather than have them appointed by the French. They sent another delegation to France in 1912 to present the "Young Algerians Manifesto", which demanded reforms including equal taxation, representation in the French National Assembly, wider suffrage and the abolition of the Code de l'Indigénat. Only minimal reforms were made in French parliamentary debates in 1913-1914, as French settler interests in the parliament were able to push back on major reforms.

They published a number of journals including L'Islam and El-Hack.

Although the group was, for a time, at the forefront of the Algerian resistance to French colonial policy, it never gained much support either from the Algerians, who saw them as aloof and overly French, or from the colons (European immigrants), who feared and suspected them. This meant that they usually performed badly in elections. In an attempt to overcome this, the Young Algerians gained the support of the popular Khalid ibn Hashim, the grandson of Abd al Qadir, the resistance fighter of the 1830s.

The Young Algerians successfully used France's need to conscript its Algerian subjects for World War I to extract a number of minor reforms from France in the immediate pre-war years. In 1917, when Clemenceau returned to power in France, a more serious attempt at reform was made but due to colon opposition, this was watered down and became the Jonnart Law passed in 1919. This reform was divisive, splitting the movement between Khalid, who demanded much more far reaching reform, and more moderate elements such as Benthai, who were largely content with the reforms as a step in the right direction.

References

Defunct political parties in Algeria
French Algeria
Political parties established in 1907
1907 establishments in Algeria
Political parties with year of disestablishment missing
1907 establishments in the French colonial empire